Guerrilla diplomacy is a method of diplomacy that is identified as an alternative approach to the established common frameworks of international relations, being primarily articulated by Daryl Copeland in response to the foreign policy outcomes of the War on Terror. In a sense, the responses to the major events of the late 20th century and the early 21st century which has brought major changes to the International Order is identified as in need of a new paradigm of diplomatic thinking in order to adapt to the needs of modern diplomacy.

Examples cited of what could be identified as guerrilla diplomacy include various activities undertaken by Sergio Vieira de Mello on behalf of the United Nations in Cambodia, former Yugoslavia and East Timor, 1991–2002; Ambassador Ken Taylor's actions during the Iran hostage crisis of 1979; Swedish Diplomat Raoul Wallenberg's efforts to save lives during World War II; and Canadian Fisheries Minister Brian Tobin's public display, from a barge in the East River opposite UN headquarters, of undersized fishing nets seized from a Spanish trawler during the "cod war" in 1994. In 2018, it was effectively applied in the UK in the Windrush scandal to  guide the strategy employed by Guy Hewitt and fellow Caribbean Community high commissioners in London to transform the Windrush issue into a national concern in Britain and bring about a major policy u-turn.

Background 

Within the book Guerrilla Diplomacy: Rethinking International Relations, a comparison to the principles that underlies Guerrilla Warfare was used, identifying some of the traits that Copeland listed as being also of utility within the context of international relations and cross-cultural diplomatic outreach, namely that of 'agility, adaptability, improvisation, self-sufficiency, and popular support’.

The book have been favourably reviewed by Professor Nicholas Cull as "essential to navigating the diplomatic rapids of the twenty-first century", and its analysis as a "milestone" in "diplomacy's current revolution" by Simon Anholt, among other notable figures offering praise for the framework proposed in this context.
 
GD responded to the marginalisation of dialogue, negotiation, and collaboration as tools of international relations and arises due to a belief that more resolute diplomatic approaches have been sidelined as a result of the militarisation of international policy which has been carried forward from the Cold War to the Global War on Terror.  It was designed in response to the challenges of globalisation, and is at home in that transformed operating environment. The principle of creating and sustaining an atmosphere of confidence, trust and respect has been identified as a necessity in order to address those perceived flaws of the current policy approaches in particular.

Discussion 

Guerrilla diplomacy operates using methods distinct from those employed in traditional diplomacy and moves contemporary thinking on public diplomacy and soft power towards new frontiers. GD takes full account of the challenges to development and security that are embedded in globalisation, and is designed to address the range of global issues, ranging from pandemic disease to climate change to resource scarcity, which are rooted in science and driven by technology. Copeland discusses the importance of this connection between science and diplomacy in his article for the journal Science & Diplomacy, entitled “Bridging the Chasm: Why Science and Technology Must Become Priorities for Diplomacy and International Policy.” It is based on meaningful exchange in two directions, in that messages are transmitted outwards, to interlocutors in the field, and are also fed back into the policy development process. At its best, therefore, GD results in altered behaviour and outcomes in both receiving and sending states.

Guerrilla diplomacy highlights the importance of abstract thinking, advanced problem-solving skills and rapid-adaptive cognition. It pushes diplomatic practice into more distant, less state-centric places, from shanty towns to conflict zones. The effectiveness of GD turns on the collection of tactical and strategic intelligence, on the development of alternative networks, and on the production of demonstrable results by boring deep into the interstices of power and navigating pathways inaccessible to others. Success at these endeavours may involve relying on technology, and especially the new media as a force multiplier, on taking a less formal approach to representation, and, perhaps most importantly, on thinking creatively, listening carefully and analysing rigorously.

The guerrilla diplomat is cross-culturally literate and capable, swimming with ease in the sea of the people rather than flopping around like a fish out of water when outside the embassy walls. Ever inventive and prepared to improvise in order to achieve objectives, the guerrilla diplomat’s ears will be to the ground, and eyes on the horizon — or tree line, or rooftops, or whatever is required to get the job done. Yet the guerrilla diplomat's play-book will be informed more by an appreciation of the unconventional and an irregular interpretation of the principles of public relations than by any reading of the doctrine of people’s war.

Comfort with risk, an affinity for outreach and a serious interest in people — in what they do and how they think about the world —  are integral to the GD territory. The guerrilla diplomat will suffocate if confined to organisational silos and drown if buried under layers of bureaucratic overburden. Standard operating procedures, awaiting instructions and doing things “by the book” may at times be necessary, but will rarely be sufficient in resolving the complex problems which characterise the sorts of fast-paced, high-risk environments best suited to GD.

In political communications generally, and for guerrilla diplomacy in particular, the how is at least as important as the what. The guerrilla diplomat is resilient, maximizing self-reliance while minimising need for the usual investment in plant, infrastructure and logistical support. Cautious introverts and ambitious careerists need not apply. Nor the reckless or insensitive: guerrilla diplomats have the street smarts to avoid alienating either their hosts — or their home government colleagues.

Key Concepts 
 
ACTE — a de-territorialized world order model designed to replace the Cold War-era. First, Second and Third World formulation by capturing the essential elements of the globalisation age. The new model may be applied to individuals, groups, neighbourhoods, cities, countries and/or regions. It consists of the:

A or advancing world, which controls the wealth and whose economic and political advantage is growing;

C or contingent world, whose prospects are uncertain and will be determined by future developments, which could tip in either direction;

T or tertiary world, characterized by endemic poverty and whose relative position is subservient or dependent;

E or excluded world, which is for the most part outside of globalization’s matrix.

Diplomatic ecosystem — an organic, multi-tiered, interdependent diplomatic whole consisting of the foreign ministry and foreign service; individual diplomats; departments and agencies of government with international policy responsibilities or content; and non-state actors.

Geodiplomatics — a systematic, non-violent  and communications-based approach to the effective management of the world’s strategic nexuses.

Global political economy of knowledge — a collaborative, heuristic and virtual  store of the world's information and expertise, accessible principally through the new media,  which pervades, supports and reinforces critical productive, transnational and power relationships, including the digital divide, on the ground.

Guerrilla diplomacy — a cross-cultural, enabled, and grassroots approach to diplomatic practice characterized by autonomy, agility, adaptability and  resilience;  a premium on intelligence gathering and analysis;  access to global political economy of knowledge; the ability to act with souplesse.

Heteropolarity - an emerging world system in which competing states or groups of states derive their relative power and influence from dissimilar sources - social, economic, political, military, cultural. The disparate vectors which empower these heterogeneous poles are difficult to compare or measure; stability in the age of globalization will therefore depend largely upon the diplomatic functions of knowledge-driven problem solving and complex balancing.

Representational footprint — the physical evidence, or lack thereof, of diplomatic presence and  infrastructure.

Souplesse  —  the ability to connect with the global political economy of knowledge for the remedial application of scientific and technological capacity in order to engage specific threats and challenges, typically in support of security and development.

References

External links
Guerrilla Diplomacy
Bibliography of Daryl Copeland’s Print Publications
Connectivity and Networks Rule 
Cyber Diplomacy
Daryl Copeland’s Flickr Photostream
Fixing Foreign Ministries: Message From Oz 
Global Dashboard: The new public diplomacy and Afghanistan (PDF)
Guerrilla Diplomacy: Delivering International Policy in a Post-9/11 World
James Eayrs on Diplomacy, Foreign Policy, International Relations
No dangling conversation: portrait of the public diplomat
PD and Counterinsurgency 
PD in Conflict Zones
PD’s Most Formidable Adversary: The Say-Do Gap 
PD, POR and the Public Environment
Public Diplomacy and Branding
Public Diplomacy Between Theory and Practice (PDF)
Putting the Human Back In Security
Review in Library Journal - Social Sciences - September 1, 2009
Review - Diplomacy in the Trenches (PDF), by Jeff Davis (Embassy - Canada's Foreign Policy Newspaper)
Review - Guerrilla tactics for diplomats, by Katharina Höne, (DiploFoundation) 
Smart Power and the Diplomatic Surge
 Science & Diplomacy 
The Science of International Politics
Transformational Public Diplomacy
USC Center on Public Diplomacy at the Annenberg School - Center Bios - Daryl Copeland 
Virtuality and Foreign Ministries
Whither Development?

Types of diplomacy